Tony Carrillo may refer to:

 Tony Carrillo (politician) (1936–2020), American politician and educator
 Tony Carrillo (cartoonist), creator of F Minus, an offbeat comic strip